The Gambia is divided into five administrative Regions (until 2007 these were known as "divisions") and one City. The divisions of the Gambia are created by the Independent Electoral Commission in accordance to Article 192 of the National Constitution.

Per 2013 census, Western region was the most populated with a population of 699,704, while Lower River was the least populated with 82,361. The maximum density of population was seen in Western with 396.59 persons per km2, while it was lowest in Lower River with 50.90 persons per km2. The maximum number of households was in Western region with 45,396 households as of 2003. Lower River had the highest infant mortality rate of 96 for every thousand births and under-five mortality of 137 per every thousand births. The poverty gap ratio was maximum in Central River with 36.45 per cent as of 2003 and lowest in Lower River with 19.80 per cent.

The Local Govemment Act passed in 2002 superseded the previous local government acts like Local Government Act (Amended 1984), Local Government (City of Banjul) Act (Amended 1988), The Kanifing Municipal Council Act 1991 and the Provinces Act. There were six local governments defined each subdivided into districts and wards. The Mayor who is the chairperson of the council and the council members of each council is elected by people of the area.

The Divisions

The Gambia is also additionally divided into eight Local Government Areas, of which two are the City of Banjul and the Municipality of Kanifing; these two collectively form Greater Banjul, although the latter now extends to parts of Brikama LGA, the former Western Division. The other six LGAs comprise the former five Divisions, although the Central River Division was divided into two LGAs, Janjanbureh LGA in the east and Kuntaur LGA in the west. The Local Government Areas are further subdivided into 43 districts. Of these, Kombo Saint Mary (which shares Brikama as a capital with the Brikama LGA) may have been administratively merged with the Greater Banjul area.

Demographics
Per 2013 census, Western region was the most populated with a population of 699,704, while Lower River was the least populated with 82,361. The maximum density of population was seen in Western with 396.59 persons per km2, while it was lowest in Lower River with 50.90 persons per km2. The maximum number of households was in Western region with 45,396 households as of 2003. Lower River had the highest infant mortality rate of 96 for every thousand births and under-five mortality of 137 per every thousand births. The poverty gap ratio was maximum in Central River with 36.45 per cent as of 2003 and lowest in Lower River with 19.80 per cent. The literacy rate was maximum in Western with 69.7 per cent compared to a national average of 62.9 per cent, while the lowest was in Upper River with 39 per cent as of 2007. The net enrollment ratio in primary education was maximum in Western (70 %), children entering first grade of primary school reaching last grade of primary education was 100 per cent in Northern Bank and the ratios of boys against girls in primary, secondary and tertiary education was maximum (1.13) in Lower River as of 2007.

Local administration
The Gambia, along with modern-day Senegal, were colonies of France and Britain until 1894 when it became a British colony. Both the countries gained independence in 1965 and operated in a federation called Senegambia from 1982. During 1989, the confederation collapsed. In a bloodless coup, Lieutenant Yahya Jamme in 1994 and went on to win multi party elections in three subsequent elections. He has also defeated coups successfully and unlike the West African countries, the Gambia has a relative stable governance. The Local Government Act passed in 2002 superseded the previous local government acts like Local Government Act (Amended 1984), Local Government (City of Banjul) Act (Amended 1988), The Kanifing Municipal Council Act 1991 and the Provinces Act. There were six local governments defined, each subdivided into districts and wards. The Mayor who is the chairperson of the council and the council members of each council are elected by people of the area. The legislation indicating the roles was not clearly defined, but the council is responsible for finance, services and planning for each sector under it. Around 25 per cent of the budget is provisioned by the central government. The council also has a Alkalo or Seyfo representative, a Chief representative, a youth nominee, a woman nominee and other nominated members of local interest groups. The city and area council elections were last held during April 2002.

See also
ISO 3166-2:GM

References

External links
 The Atlas of the Gambia

 
Gambia
Gambia